Adrian Newman may refer to:

 Adrian Newman (producer), Australian songwriter and record producer
 Adrian Newman (bishop) (born 1958), British Anglican bishop